Agapanthia schurmanni is a species of beetle in the family Cerambycidae. It was described by Sama in 1979.

References

schurmanni
Beetles described in 1979